Sayani Datta  is a Bengali film actress. She started her career with the film Na Hannyate in 2012.  Her second film, Shada Kalo Abcha, entered the international film festival circuit. In 2016, she acted in a short film called Feet and Foe directed by Soumodeep Ghosh Chowdhury. She was also the celebrity model for the first edition of the FFACE calendar 2014. Recently Datta has made her Hindi Debut with  Gurmeet Choudhary in The Wife.

Filmography 
List of films of Sayani Datta

Web series

Royal moods added mineral water

In the year of 2018 Sayani made her debut in national advertisement with Bournvita. She has also been seen in the advertisement for Coloroso Sarees, a boutique style saree shop with web presence.

References

Actresses in Bengali cinema
Bengali female models
University of Calcutta alumni
1987 births
Living people
Female models from Kolkata
People from Howrah